

Johannes Friessner (22 March 1892 – 26 June 1971) was a German general in the Wehrmacht during World War II. He was a recipient of the Knight's Cross of the Iron Cross with Oak Leaves.

Biography
Born in Chemnitz, Saxony, Friessner enlisted in the German Army in 1911 and, after seeing extensive duty during World War I, served in the Reichswehr following the war.

After his promotion to Generalmajor during World War II on 1 August 1940, Friessner was assigned to the Eastern Front on 1 May 1942 and placed in command of the 102nd Infantry Division. Shortly after his promotion to Generalleutnant on 1 October 1942, Friessner served as commander of the XXIII Corps from 19 January to 11 December 1943. On 1 April 1943, he was promoted General der Infanterie (General of the Infantry).

In February 1944, Friessner was transferred to the Northern Front and assigned command to Sponheimer Group (renamed army detachment "Narva" on 23 February). Promoted to Generaloberst on 1 July, Friessner briefly held command of Army Group North until 25 July before being sent to the southern front to command Army Group South Ukraine (later redesignated Army Group South). Unable to halt the four month Soviet offensive by Marshal Rodion Malinovsky's Second Ukrainian Front, Friessner was relieved of his command on 22 December. Holding no further command for the remainder of the war, Friessner lived in retirement in Bayerisch Gmain until his death on 26 June 1971.

Frießner was no longer tenable as chairman of the VdS after he had justified the invasion of Poland as a legitimate measure to "protect the ethnic Germans in Poland" at a press conference on 21 September 1951 and he had favourably compared the "decently fighting Waffen-SS" to the officers of the 20 July plot, who, according to him, had chosen a method that was to be rejected "from the military point of view", and namely "political murder".

During the early 1950s he was active in advising on the redevelopment of the West German army, the Bundeswehr. In 1956, Friessner wrote Verratene Schlachten (Betrayed Battles), a memoir of his tour of command of Army Group South Ukraine.

Awards
 Iron Cross (1914) 2nd Class (15 September 1914) & 1st Class (19 September 1916)

 Clasp to the Iron Cross (1939) 2nd Class (27 July 1942) & 1st Class (21 August 1942)
 German Cross in Gold on 9 June 1943 as General der Infanterie and commanding general of the XXXXI. Panzerkorps
 Knight's Cross of the Iron Cross with Oak Leaves
 Knight's Cross on 23 July 1943 as General der Infanterie and commanding general of the XXIII. Armeekorps
 445th Oak Leaves 9 April 1944 as General der Infanterie and leader of the Army Detachment Narwa

References

Citations

Bibliography

 
 
 
 
 

1892 births
1971 deaths
Military personnel from Chemnitz
German Army generals of World War II
Colonel generals of the German Army (Wehrmacht)
German Army personnel of World War I
Recipients of the clasp to the Iron Cross, 1st class
Recipients of the Gold German Cross
Recipients of the Knight's Cross of the Iron Cross with Oak Leaves
German prisoners of war in World War II held by the United States
People from the Kingdom of Saxony